The 2014 Triple J Hottest 100 was announced on Australia Day, 26 January 2015. It was the 22nd countdown of the most popular songs of the year, as chosen by the listeners of Australian radio station Triple J.  It was won by "Talk Is Cheap", one of three songs that Chet Faker had in the top 10 (the others being "1998" and "Gold").

Voting commenced in mid-December 2014, and closed on 18 January 2015. Voters nominated ten songs that were released between December 2013 and November 2014 and submitted them through the Triple J website. In total, over 2 million votes were cast, breaking the previous record set in 2012. The year's countdown was notable for having seven Australian artists in the top ten and the top three positions being awarded to Australians, the first year for both to have occurred.

BuzzFeed campaigned for Taylor Swift's song "Shake It Off" but the track was eventually disqualified.

Full list

Artists with multiple entries

Four tracks
Chet Faker (1, 7, 8, 21)

Three tracks
Hilltop Hoods (3, 36, 57)
Vance Joy (13, 50, 93)
alt-J (14, 16, 26)
Ball Park Music (19, 58, 99)
Sticky Fingers (20, 86, 94)
The Amity Affliction (22, 64, 71)
Meg Mac (24, 46, 91)
Thundamentals (30, 78, 90)

Two tracks
Peking Duk (2, 5)
Milky Chance (4, 44)
Safia (Once with Peking Duk and once solo) (5, 96)
Scarlett Stevens (Once with Illy and once with San Cisco) (17, 33)
Lorde (18, 47) 
Childish Gambino (31, 60)
Allday (35, 65)
Flight Facilities (39, 52)
Chvrches (54, 85)
Kingswood (56, 76)
Röyksopp and Robyn (59, 73)

Countries represented
Australia – 60
United States – 18
United Kingdom – 15
New Zealand – 3
Sweden – 3
Norway – 3
Germany – 2
Canada – 1
France – 1
Iceland – 1
Zimbabwe - 1

Notes
 The 2014 Hottest 100 marks only the third time all Top 3 songs have been from Australian artists, following the countdowns for 1999 and 2006.
 78 unique musical acts appeared on this countdown, 15 of which featured additional artists collaborating.
 This year's Hottest 100 gathered over 2 million votes, the first to break the 2 million vote mark and the holds the record for the highest number of votes in a single countdown.
 Chet Faker is the first artist to win the Hottest 100, Triple J Album Poll, the J Award and achieve the most tracks in a countdown in a single year.
 Chet Faker joins Denis Leary (1993), Alex Lloyd (2001), Bernard Fanning (2005) and Vance Joy (2013) as the only outright solo countdown winners.
 Chet Faker became the second artist to chart three times in the top 10 places after Powderfinger achieved the feat in 2003.
A week after the Hottest 100 was announced, the songs placed 101–200th in the poll were announced, with "Tell Me" by Golden Features featuring Nicole Millar taking 101st position.
 Royal Blood became the fourth band after Doves in 2000, Bloc Party in 2008 and Cut Copy in 2011 to make the albums poll but not feature in the Hottest 100. It was later revealed by Triple J that the band had come 102nd, 105th and 117th.

CD release
The Triple J Hottest 100 CD for 2014 is the twenty second edition of the series. The track list was revealed on Triple J's Facebook page on 2 February 2015; the double-CD was released on 27 February 2015.

(The number in brackets is the song position in the Hottest 100.)

Top 10 Albums of 2014
A smaller poll of Triple J listeners' favourite albums of the year was held in December 2014.

References

2014 in Australian music
Australia Triple J
2014